Dunbarton High School is located in Pickering, Ontario, Canada, and is part of the Durham District School Board. The school has students in grades 9-12 and offers a wide range of academic and extracurricular activities. Their mascot is the Spartan. It has obtained the use of a former public school to serve as its arts facility (South Campus). The classes in this campus are English, art, music, drama, and dance.

History 
All sources in the history section come from a 2020-2021 issue of the Dunbarton High School year book titled "SPARTAN TIMES" using information on pages 62 and 63 in a section titled "60th Anniversary".

1960s 
1961: - Dunbarton High School opened with approximately 300 students (14 classes) and 30 staff members.

1963: - The first Dunbarton High School yearbook was published.

1970s 
1970: - The first big addition was added to the school which included the new office, resource centre, cafeteria, guidance and the west gym. 

1971: - The pool and tech wing were added to the school.

1980s 
1980: - The school created and accepted Dunbar as their mascot.

1990s 
During this decade the Dunbarton High School adopted the smoking ban of the area.

1991: - Student population reached 2500, and approximately 30 portables existed.

2000s 
2001: - The schools weight room was added. 

2003: - South Campus was acquired (originally Woodland PS).

2007: - Renovations were made to the exterior of the building.

2010s 
During this decade, fellow former City of Pickering high school student Shawn Mendes, performed a concert at the school. 

2014: - Dunbarton High School was awarded the Greenest School on Earth award, from the U.S. Green Building Council.

2020s 
2020:- Dunbarton High School followed a province wide movement to close schools during the covid-19 pandemic, following march break. 
  
2020: - 2021: - Dunbarton High School implements a quadmester, hybrid learning model system because of the pandemic.
  
2021: - an elevator was installed to connect the 400's, 200's(tech wing) and 100's levels.

Schedule 
Dunbarton High School's first year had the school open every day at 8:55 am and close at 5 pm (9:00 am to 3:18 pm for the periods of the school day), and had 10 periods (8 for classes and 2 for lunch). Up until the covid-19 pandemic the school had a semester model with the school day start at 8:40 am and end at 2:48 pm, with 4 periods for classes. 6 minuets was given in-between periods, 45 minutes was given for lunch, in-between periods 2 and 3, and periods 1 and 2 as well as periods 3 and 4 switched with each other every single week. Since the pandemic the school has adopted a quadmester model. The school day lasts from 10 am to 4 pm with two periods, four blocks, two blocks for each period, and 1 hour of lunch in-between the two periods. In February 2022 the school has returned to the semester model with 4 periods for classes, the 6 minutes between classes and the 45 minute lunch was reinstated.

Stabbing 
On February 23, 2016, a mass stabbing occurred at the school. Nine people — six students and three staff members — were injured. A 14-year-old girl (whose identity is protected by the Youth Criminal Justice Act) was arrested as a result of the stabbing.

Notable alumni 
 Sean Avery, retired NHL player
 Cristine Brache, visual artist, writer and filmmaker 
 Rex Bromfield, writer and director
 Valri Bromfield, actress and comedian
 Shelly-Ann Brown, Olympic bobsledder
 Josie Dye, radio and television personality
 Jeff Geddis, (Bryan Stiles)
 Anson Henry, Canadian track and field athlete, 2004 Athens Summer Olympics, 2008 Beijing Summer Olympics
 Nikkita Holder, Canadian track and field athlete, 2012 London Summer Olympics
 Carly Lawrence, model and season 2 contestant on Too Hot to Handle
 John Moonlight, Captain of Canada's rugby team
 Brad Phillips, visual artist, novelist and essayist
 Jaime Peters, soccer player for Ipswich Town and Team Canada
 Sean Pierson, mixed martial artist for the Ultimate Fighting Championship 
 Sarah Slean, singer-songwriter, painter, and photographer
 Jennifer Wakefield, Olympic hockey player
Many of the notable alumni listed above can be found on a plaque in the 100's level of the school.
 Adil Shamasdin, professional tennis player, Wimbledon Quarter-Finalist, former top 50 in the world.

See also
 List of high schools in Ontario

References

External links
Dunbarton High School

High schools in the Regional Municipality of Durham
Pickering, Ontario
1961 establishments in Canada
Educational institutions established in 1961